Garazh may refer to:
 The Garage (1979 film), a Soviet film
 Garazh, Dorud, a village in Iran
 Garazh, Khorramabad, a village in Iran